The men's 100 metre backstroke event at the 2012 Summer Olympics took place on 29–30 July at the London Aquatics Centre in London, United Kingdom.

On the wake of Aaron Peirsol's official retirement in 2011, U.S. swimmer Matt Grevers continued to build an American supremacy in the event by following the former champion's footsteps towards his first individual gold. He held off a challenge from France's Camille Lacourt down the final stretch to touch the wall first in a sterling time of 52.16, eclipsing Peirsol's 2008 Olympic record by 0.38 seconds. Grevers also enjoyed his teammate Nick Thoman taking home the silver in 52.92, as the Americans climbed again on top of the podium for an eleventh time in the event's Olympic history and for a second straight 1–2 finish since 2008. Moving from behind at the final turn, Japan's Ryosuke Irie came up with a stalwart swim to capture the bronze in 52.97.

Leading the race early on the initial length, Lacourt dropped off the podium to a fourth-place time in 53.08. Great Britain's Liam Tancock (53.35), Germany's Helge Meeuw (53.48), Australia's defending bronze medalist Hayden Stoeckel (53.55), and China's Cheng Feiyi (53.77) also vied for an Olympic medal to round out the finale.

Other notable swimmers featured Russian duo Arkady Vyatchanin, reigning Olympic bronze medalist, who missed the final roster with a ninth-place effort (53.79); and Vladimir Morozov, who later scratched the semifinals to focus on his 4×100 m freestyle relay duty, allowing Greece's three-time Olympian Aristeidis Grigoriadis to occupy his slot.

Records
Prior to this competition, the existing world and Olympic records were as follows.

The following records were established during the competition:

Results

Heats

Semifinals

Semifinal 1

Semifinal 2

Final

References

External links
NBC Olympics Coverage

Men's 00100 metre backstroke
Men's events at the 2012 Summer Olympics